"The Jackie" is a song by American rappers Bas and J. Cole featuring Lil Tjay. It was released on July 9, 2021, with an accompanying music video, and was produced by T-Minus.

Background
Dreamville Records teased the song on July 6, 2021 on social media, calling it a "summer anthem". "The Jackie" refers to Jackie Robinson Parkway.

Composition
The melodic song features a "bouncy" beat produced by T-Minus. It begins with a chorus from J. Cole, with the lyrics "You see the drop top, bitch / Stop playing with me / She say she wanna let the waves splash down on me". Bas then sings the first verse, starting with "I'm on the way, send me the addy, I'm on the Jackie / Five on the belt, ten on the jacket, you gotta have me / It's been a day, I don't wanna wait no more". Lil Tjay handles the next verse, and Cole sings the last verse with eight lines.

Critical reception
Abby Jones of Consequence called the song "a caffeinated, heavy-hitting trap song that acts as an ode of sorts to New York summer nights". Brad Callas of Complex wrote that Bas' "sing-song opening verse pairs well with Tjay's signature melodic approach". Sophie Caraan called the chorus "catchy", and wrote that the "imposing" verses from Bas and Lil Tjay "sound like they're currently at the top of their game". Wongo Okon of Uproxx described the track as "extremely confident".

Music video
The music video, directed by John Tashiro, shows J. Cole as an Uber driver equipped with snacks and drinks. He picks up Bas and his girlfriend in an old school convertible and cruises around New York City before going to a party. Mark Phillips of RDCWorld1, a content-creating group, appears in the video, in which he recreates a viral meme of J. Cole: he approaches Cole and calls him by his real name, then asks for an autograph before Cole drives away.

Charts

References

2021 singles
2021 songs
Bas (rapper) songs
Interscope Records singles
J. Cole songs
Lil Tjay songs
Song recordings produced by T-Minus (record producer)
Songs written by Bas (rapper)
Songs written by J. Cole
Songs written by T-Minus (record producer)
Trap music songs
Songs written by Lil Tjay